Philip Dennis Arthur May (born Wadey, later Kattner; 9 November 1944 – 15 May 2020) was an English vocalist. He gained fame in the 1960s as the lead singer of Pretty Things, of which he was a founding member.  May remained a member throughout the band's changing line-up over the years, and was one of the band's main lyricists. He was the primary lyricist for the album S.F. Sorrow.

Biography

Early life
Born Philip Wadey in Dartford, Kent, he was raised by his aunt and uncle, whose surname was May. In childhood he was sent back to live with his mother and stepfather, whose surname was Kattner, but later decided to change his name back to May.

The Pretty Things

He formed the Pretty Things at Sidcup Art College in 1963 with guitarist Dick Taylor, who had recently left the fledgling Rolling Stones. With May as lead singer, the band became part of the British blues rock scene and quickly gained a recording contract. They became popular and had a number of hit singles including the UK Top Ten   "Don't Bring Me Down".

In the late 1960s, The Pretty Things started to branch out into psychedelia and May became a prominent counterculture figure, known for his claim of having "the longest hair in Britain", drug-taking and bisexuality. The 1968 album S.F. Sorrow, which was released on the Motown imprint Rare Earth, was regarded as the first rock opera album. The songs and lyrics were based on stories written by May, which were often written whilst the album was being recorded. May later admitted that his usage of LSD had a major impact on the album, saying "“It was like a sharpening of the imagination for me. I don’t think S.F. Sorrow would have been impossible without it, but there’s a lot of acid [in] the imagery." The album was not successful at the time, only later becoming a cult favourite. May remained with the Pretty Things until they retired in 2018, following a final concert with guests including David Gilmour and Van Morrison.

Phil May and the Fallen Angels
In 1976 a new group called the Fallen Angels, led by guitarist Mickey Finn, with Greg Ridley from Spooky Tooth and Humble Pie, Twink from the Pretty Things, and Bob Weston from Fleetwood Mac set out to record an album and for vocals recruited May. However, after they had recorded only eight partially complete songs, all except May abandoned the project. May recruited some more players to complete the album Phil May and the Fallen Angels, which was only released in the Netherlands.

Death
He died on 15 May 2020, aged 75, in a hospital in King's Lynn, from complications following hip surgery after a cycling accident. He is survived by his partner and two children.

References

External links
 

1944 births
2020 deaths
20th-century English singers
20th-century British male singers
21st-century English singers
21st-century British male singers
Accidental deaths in England
Bisexual men
Bisexual musicians
British rhythm and blues boom musicians
English male singers
English pop singers
English rhythm and blues musicians
English rhythm and blues singers
English rock singers
English songwriters
Male pop singers
Male songwriters
Musicians from Kent
People from Dartford
Pretty Things members
Protopunk musicians
British LGBT singers
20th-century English LGBT people
21st-century English LGBT people